Kustaa August Syrjänen (5 December 1883, in Sääksmäki – 31 December 1956) was a Finnish schoolteacher and politician. He was a member of the Parliament of Finland from 1933 to 1945, representing the Social Democratic Party of Finland (SDP).

References

1883 births
1956 deaths
People from Valkeakoski
People from Häme Province (Grand Duchy of Finland)
Social Democratic Party of Finland politicians
Members of the Parliament of Finland (1933–36)
Members of the Parliament of Finland (1936–39)
Members of the Parliament of Finland (1939–45)
Finnish people of World War II
Finnish schoolteachers